McGregor Heights is an unincorporated community in Clayton County, Iowa, United States. McGregor Heights lies on the Mississippi River, and on Iowa's border with Wisconsin.  The county seat of Elkader lies 17 miles to the southwest.

References

Unincorporated communities in Clayton County, Iowa
Unincorporated communities in Iowa